
Polyzoniida is an order of millipedes in the subterclass Colobognatha containing three families and at least 74 described species.

Description

Polyzoniidans have a somewhat domed dorsal surface with a flat ventral side. Their heads are small and cone-like, with few ocelli. They lack a dorsal groove and paranota (lateral extensions of each segment).

Classification
The order Polyzoniida contains three families:
Hirudisomatidae Silvestri, 1896 (6 genera, 20 species)
Polyzoniidae Newport, 1844 (6 genera, 22 species)
Siphonotidae Cook, 1895 (15 genera, 40 species)

Distribution
The family Hirudisomatidae occurs from Spain to the Himalayas in Eurasia, Japan, and in North America from southwest Canada to central Mexico. Polyzoniidae has a holarctic (northern hemisphere) distribution, occurring in the northwest and northeast United States, eastern Canada, and in Europe from the United Kingdom and France to Siberia.
Siphonotidae has a southern distribution, occurring in Brazil and Chile, South Africa, Southeast Asia, Indonesia, Tasmania, and New Zealand.

References

External links

Polyzoniida of Tasmania

 
Millipede orders